Red Lion Creek is a stream in the U.S. state of Delaware. It is a tributary of the Delaware River.

Red Lion Creek took its name from a tavern of the same name near its course in Red Lion.

See also
List of rivers of Delaware

References

Rivers of New Castle County, Delaware
Rivers of Delaware
Tributaries of the Delaware River